Jorge Luis Pila (born August 3, 1972) is a Czech-born Cuban actor, known for acting in Telenovelas like La Patrona (2013), Yacaranday (1999). His debut was in Al norte del corazón (1997). His mother is from Czech Republic and his father is from Cuba.

He is known for acting in telenovelas such as Al norte del corazón, Secreto de amor, Súbete a mi moto, Más sabe el diablo, Aurora, Acorralada, ¿Dónde está Elisa?, Corazón valiente, La patrona, En otra piel, Eva la Trailera, Early life
He started his career modeling in Cuba. Later on, he moved to Mexíco where he continued modeling and then became a dancer accompanying Mexícan singer Yuri during her concert tours for more than two years.

Pila then enrolled in the Centro de Educación en las Artes (CEA), which is an entertainment educational institution in Mexíco run by that country's major media conglomerate, Televisa. 

 Filmography 

Personal life
His first wife was called Yamili Valenzuela Canseco, Yuri's sister. He was briefly married to actress Anette Michel, his partner in Al norte de corazon''. He has a daughter, Sabrina, born on March 8, 2007, from a relationship that ended in 2008.

External links

References

1972 births
Living people
Cuban male television actors
Cuban male telenovela actors
People educated at Centro de Estudios y Formación Actoral
20th-century Cuban male actors
21st-century Cuban male actors
Czech people of Cuban descent
Cuban people of Czech descent